The following lists events that happened during 1910 in the Kingdom of Belgium.

Incumbents
Monarch: Albert I
Prime Minister: Frans Schollaert

Events

 23 April to 1 November – Exposition Universelle et Internationale (world's fair) held in Brussels.
 22 May – Belgian general election, 1910
 1-6 August – First International Congress of Entomology held in Brussels.
 23 September – Brussels Convention on Assistance and Salvage at Sea concluded.

Publications
Periodicals
 Annuaire de la Société d'Archéologie de Bruxelles, vol. 21
 Le Masque (monthly review of art and literature) begins publication

Books
 Henri Hymans, Bruxelles (Paris, Librairie Renouard)
 Godefroid Kurth, La Cité de Liège au Moyen-Âge, vol. 2-3 (Brussels, Dewit; Liège, Cormaux et Demarteau)
 B. Seebohm Rowntree, Land and Labour: Lessons From Belgium (London, Macmillan)
 Émile Verhaeren, Les Rythmes souverains and Les Villes à pignons

Art and architecture
Cinema
 Toto et sa soeur en bombe à Bruxelles

Births
 23 January – Django Reinhardt, jazz musician (died 1953)
 10 February – Georges Pire, Dominican friar (died 1969)
 10 May – Bernard Voorhoof, footballer (died 1974)
 29 July – Hector Riské, wrestler (died 1984)
 18 September – Hendrik Cornelis, colonial governor (died 1999)
 24 September – Jean Servais, actor (died 1976)
 27 November – Paul M. G. Lévy, journalist (2002)

Deaths
 17 January – Elisa Caroline Bommer (born 1832), botanist 
 28 April – Edouard Van Beneden (born 1846), biologist
 18 May – Florimond Van Duyse (born 1843), musicologist
 21 July – Maurice Joostens (born 1862), diplomat
 21 October – Charles van der Stappen (born 1843), sculptor
 23 October – Eugène Joors (born 1850), painter
 8 November – Adeline Plunkett (born 1824), ballerina
 19 November – Gustave Serrurier-Bovy (born 1858), designer

References

 
1900s in Belgium
Belgium
Belgium
Years of the 20th century in Belgium